Robert Shallcross is an American film director and screenwriter and advertising writer. He worked for many years in the advertising business in Chicago. He crossed into feature-length films as a writer for the family comedy Little Giants (1994). He followed this up with Bored Silly (2000), and the family film Uncle Nino (2003).

References

External links
 
 
 
 

Year of birth missing (living people)
American male screenwriters
American film directors
Writers from Chicago
Living people
Screenwriters from Illinois